The Games 100 is an annual feature of Games magazine, a United States magazine devoted to games and puzzles. The Games 100 first appeared in the November/December 1980 issue as an alphabetic list of the 100 games preferred by the editors of the magazine. In 1981, Games introduced The Games 100 Contest, which involved identifying pieces from games listed in the Games 100, with the grand prize being more than half of the games on that list. Games continues to publish this list as "The Buyers Guide to Games", broken out into "The Traditional Games 100" and "The Electronic Games 100".

Lists are published in either the November or December issue.  Through 1994, the lists for a year were published at the end of that year.  Starting in 1995, lists are released at the end of the year prior to the year of the list. (This means that there was no list for 1995.  There was also no list for 1990, because Games was temporarily out of publication during the period when the list would have been published.)  There are several categories for which "best" games are determined.

The winner of the historical category for approximately the last ten years has been determined by one individual, Walt O'Hara, who runs the Historicon miniatures convention.

Winning titles

Hall of Fame
Part of the Buyer's Guide includes a hall of fame for "games that have met or exceeded the highest standards of quality and play value and have been continuously in production for at least 10 years; i.e., classics."

This Hall of Fame includes:
 Acquire
 Apples to Apples
 Axis & Allies
 Blockhead!
 Bridgette
 Civilization
 Cluedo (Clue)
 Diplomacy
 Dungeons & Dragons
 Magic: The Gathering (inducted in the 2004 Buyer's Guide)
 Mille Bornes (inducted in the 1991 Games 100)
 Monopoly
 Othello
 Pente (inducted in the 1991 Games 100)
 Risk
 Scrabble Crossword Game
 The Settlers of Catan (inducted in the 2006 Buyer's Guide)
 Sorry!
 Stratego
 Taboo (inducted in the 2001 Buyer's Guide)
 TriBond (inducted in the 2001 Buyer's Guide)
 Trivial Pursuit
 Twister (inducted in the 1991 Games 100)
 TwixT (not included in the 1999 and 2000 Buyer's Guides due to temporary discontinuance of production)
 Yahtzee

References

External links
100 Games, 1980 to 2010, at BoardGameGeek
2004 Games Magazine Top 100 Games
1999 Games Magazine Top 100 Games

Puzzle magazines
Board game awards

de:Games Magazine#Games 100